Prince Grigory Grigoryevich Orlov (6 October 1734, Bezhetsky Uyezd – 13 April 1783, Moscow) was a favourite of the Empress Catherine the Great of Russia. He became a leader of the 1762 coup which overthrew Catherine's husband Peter III of Russia and installed Catherine as empress. For some years he was virtually co-ruler with her, but his repeated infidelities and the enmity of Catherine's other advisers led to his fall from power.

Overthrow of Peter
Orlov was the son of Gregory Orlov, governor of Great Novgorod. He had a younger brother Alexei Grigoryevich Orlov who would equally gain military and political prominence in Russia. Grigory Orlov was educated in the corps of cadets at Saint Petersburg, began his military career in the Seven Years' War, and was wounded at Zorndorf. While serving in the capital as an artillery officer, he caught the fancy of the then Grand Duchess Catherine Alekseyevna, and was the leader of the conspiracy which resulted in the dethronement and death of her husband, Emperor Peter III (1762).

After the event, Empress Catherine raised him to the rank of count and made him adjutant-general, director-general of engineers, and general-in-chief. They had an illegitimate son, Aleksey who was named after the village of Bobriki, and from whom descends the line of the Count Bobrinsky. Orlov's influence became paramount after the discovery of the Khitrovo plot to murder the whole Orlov family. At one time, the Empress thought of marrying her favorite, but the plan was frustrated by her influential advisor Nikita Panin.

Years of power

Orlov was no statesman, but he had a quick wit, a fairly accurate appreciation of current events, and was a useful and sympathetic counselor during the earlier portion of Catherine's reign. He entered with enthusiasm, from both patriotic and economic motives, into the question of the improvement of the condition of the serfs and their partial emancipation. As the president of the Free Economic Society, he was also their most prominent advocate in the great commission of 1767, though he aimed primarily at pleasing the empress, who affected great liberality in her earlier years.

He was one of the earliest propagandists of the Slavophile idea of the emancipation of the Christians from Ottoman rule. In 1771, he was sent as first Russian plenipotentiary to the peace congress of Focşani, but he failed in his mission, owing partly to the obstinacy of the Ottomans, and partly (according to Panin) to his own outrageous insolence.

Fall
Meanwhile, Orlov's enemies, led by Panin, were attempting to break up the relationship between Orlov and Catherine. They informed the empress that Orlov had seduced his 13-year-old relative. A handsome young officer, Alexander Vasilchikov, was installed as her new lover.

To rekindle Catherine's affection, Grigory presented to her one of the greatest diamonds of the world, known ever since as the Orlov Diamond. By the time he returned – without permission – to his Marble Palace at Saint Petersburg, Orlov found himself superseded in the empress's favor by the younger Grigory Potemkin. When Potemkin, in 1774, superseded Vasilchikov as the queen's lover, Orlov became of no account at court and went abroad for some years. He returned to Russia a few months prior to his death in Moscow in 1783.

Later years and death
In 1777, at the age of 43, he married his 18-year-old relative, Catherine Zinovyeva, variously described by sources as either a niece or a cousin, but left no children by that marriage. Catherine died of tuberculosis in 1781, at the age of 23, in Lausanne, Switzerland. Her tomb, from which her body was removed in 1910, still remains in Cathedrale Notre-Dame in Lausanne.

For some time before his death, he suffered from a serious mental illness, probably a form of dementia, which progressed towards complete mental collapse. After his death, the Empress Catherine wrote, "Although I have long been prepared for this sad event, it has nevertheless shaken me to the depths of my being. People may console me, I may even repeat to myself all those things which it is customary to say on such occasions--my only answer is strangled tears. I suffer intolerably."

References

External links

 

1734 births
1783 deaths
People from Bezhetsky District
Russian nobility
Lovers of Catherine the Great
Russian military personnel of the Seven Years' War
Princes of the Holy Roman Empire
18th-century diplomats of the Russian Empire
Governors-General of Moscow
Russian royal favourites